State Route 274 (SR 274) is a primary state highway in the U.S. state of Virginia. Known as Riverside Drive, the state highway runs  from U.S. Route 58 and US 221 near Independence east to SR 94 near Fries. Together with SR 94, SR 274 forms part of the old alignment of US 58 and US 221 between Independence and Galax in eastern Grayson County.

Route description

SR 274 begins at US 58 and US 221 (Grayson Parkway) a short distance east of the town of Independence. The state highway heads northeast as a two-lane undivided road and veers north on reaching the New River. SR 274 follows the river north and east along its left bank, once veering away from the river as it bends southeast. The state highway reaches its eastern terminus at SR 94, which heads north as Scenic Road toward Fries and east as a continuation of Riverside Drive.

Major intersections

References

External links

Virginia Highways Project: VA 274

274
State Route 274